van Heyningen and Haward is an architectural practice, founded in 1983 by Birkin Haward and Joanna van Heyningen, and now owned and managed by James McCosh and Meryl Townley. The London architects work primarily in education, and have also worked in the heritage, community and health sectors.

In 2010 the practice produced a monograph detailing their work to date; van Heyningen and Haward – Buildings and Projects. The book was published by Right Angle Publishing and edited by Ian Latham. As well as giving an overview of the projects undertaken by the practice from inception until publication, it also includes essays by Trevor Garnham and contributions by Ken Powell and Patrick Lynch. The launch party for the book was held at Latymer Upper School, a long-standing client of the practice.

Selected projects

 Quintin Kynaston Community Academy (now Harris Academy St John's Wood), St John's Wood, North London
 Leicester Cathedral reordering
 Bow School, East London
 Cory Environmental Centre, Mucking Marshes, Essex
 Rainham Marshes Nature Reserve, Environment and Education Centre
 Clovelly Visitor Centre, North Devon
 Platform, Islington
 Lerner Court, Clare College, Cambridge
 Refurbishment of No.1 Smithery, Chatham Historic Dockyard, Kent
 Bolton Market Hall
 City and Islington College Sixth Form Centre
 Latymer Upper School
 Rivergate Centre, Barking
 Kaleidoscope, Lewisham
 New North London Synagogue
 Wilson Court, Fitzwilliam College, Cambridge
 West Ham station
 Gateway to the White Cliffs, Dover
 Jacqueline Du Pré Music Building, St Hilda's College, Oxford
 Stelios Ioannou Centre for Classical and Byzantine Studies, University of Oxford
 National Centre for Early Music, York
 Sutton Hoo Visitor Centre, Suffolk
 Polhill Library, University of Bedfordshire
 Chinese Picture Gallery, Ashmolean Museum, University of Oxford 
 Tomb of Richard III, Leicester Cathedral

Awards

2015

 Civic Trust Award Commendation for Bow School

2013

 RICS East of England Design and Innovation Award for Cory Environmental Centre
 RICS East of England Leisure and Tourism Award for Cory Environmental Centre
 RICS East of England Project of the Year Award for Cory Environmental Centre
 Shortlisted for RIBA East Award for Cory Environmental Centre
 Civic Trust Community Benefit Award for Cory Environmental Centre, Commendation

2012

 RICS Regeneration Highly Commended Award for Rivergate Centre, Barking
 RICS Community Benefit Highly Commended Award for Platform, Islington

2011

 RIBA South Conservation Award for No.1 Smithery, Chatham
 Camden and Islington Business Award for Best Property Business
 RIBA Award for No.1 Smithery, Chatham Historic Dockyard
 Regeneration and Renewal Awards Highly Commended for No.1 Smithery, Chatham Historic Dockyard

2010

 Brick Award, Best Outdoor Space for Corfield Court, St John's College
 LABC Regional Award, Best Technical Design for Corfield Court, St John's College
 RIBA Award  for Edward Alleyn Building, Alleyn's School
 Building Award Highly Commended for Architectural Practice of the Year
 Civic Trust Award Commendation for Dennis Sciama Building, University of Portsmouth

Publications and press

2012 

 Architecture Today, October – "Wild at Heart", Cory Environmental Visitor Centre
 Architects Journal, October – "vHH completes another nature reserve scheme", "Week in Pictures", Cory Environmental Visitor Centre
 Building Magazine – "Back to Nature", Cory Environmental Visitor Centre
 Architects Journal, April – "Bricks and Torah", New North London Synagogue
 RIBA Journal, April – "Hide and Seek", Cory Environmental Visitor Centre
 RIBA Sector Review, London 2012 – Featuring: Rivergate Centre

2011 

 School Building Magazine – "The Science of Renewable's", Science and Library Building, Latymer Upper School
 Architecture Today, February – "Three part harmony:van Heyningen and Haward at Latymer School ", Science and Library Building, Latymer Upper School
 RIBA Sector Review, London 2011 – Featuring: Edward Alleyn Building, Alleyn's School
 RIBA The List 2011 – Featuring: Edward Alleyn Building, Alleyn's School
 21st Century London: The New Architecture, Kenneth Powell – Merrell Publishing – Featuring: Kaleidoscope Children and Young People's Centre

2010 

 Architects' Journal, 10 June – "RIBA Awards 2010", Edward Alleyn Building
 PLAN, June/July – "Schools of the Future", Edward Alleyn Building
 Building, 23 July – "Salvage Operation", No.1 Smithery, Chatham Historic Dockyard
 Building Design, 30 July – "Naval Gazing", No.1 Smithery, Chatham Historic Dockyard
 van Heyningen and Haward Buildings and Projects – Right Angle Publishing
 RIBA Sector Review, Education 2010 – Featuring: Edward Alleyn Building, Alleyn's School
 RIBA Sector Review, Conservation 2010 – Featuring: Corfield Court, St John's College

2009 

 Architects' Journal, 19 November – "Cash Injection for England's Youth Centres", Hornsey Road Baths Development
 Building Design, 31 July – "Education" Barking Riverside
 Building Design, 17 July – "Reaching for the Stars" Dennis Sciama Building, University of Portsmouth
 AR Ketipo, May – RSPB Environment and Education Centre, Technical Study
 Architects' Journal, 23 April – "New Court, Clare College" Building Study
 RIBA Journal, 1 April – "State of the Market", Bolton Market Hall
 Architecture 09 RIBA Buildings of the Year, Tony Chapman, Merrell, London – Featuring: Lerner Court, Clare College

2008 

 Architecture Today, January – "Fit For Purpose" Classical Studies Centre, Oxford University
 Sustainable Healthcare Architecture, Wiley – Featuring: Kaleiodsope, Children and Young People's Centre

2007 

 Architects' Journal, 13 December – Ysgol Ifor Bach, Caerphilly Primary School
 Architects' Journal, 28 June – RIBA Awards – RSPB Environment and Education Centre, Rainham Marshes and Kaleidoscope, Children and Young People's Centre
 Architectural Design, May/June – Kaleidoscope, Children and Young People's Centre, Lewisham
 HD, April – "The Green Trial" Kaleidoscope, Children and Young People's Centre, Lewisham
 A10, March/April – "Optimistic Look-out" RSPB Environment and Education Centre, Rainham Marshes
 Grand Designs, March – Eye Catcher – RSPB Environment and Education Centre, Rainham Marshes
 The Telegraph, 13 January – "Life returns to a wasteland of war" RSPB Environment and Education Centre, Rainham Marshes
 RIBA Journal, January – "Gone with the Wind" RSPB Environment and Education Centre, Rainham Marshes
 Sustain, January – "RSPB Timber Take-Off" RSPB Environment and Education Centre, Rainham Marshes
 Building Design, January – "Colour and light create Kaleidoscope" Kaleidoscope, Children and Young People's Centre, Lewisham
 New London Architecture, Kenneth Powell, Merrell, London – Featuring: Enfield College, London

2006 

Architects' Journal, December – "van Heyningen and Haward / Rainham Marshes" RSPB Environment and Education Centre, Rainham Marshes
 The Times, 14 November – "Spare A Thought For Old Man River" RSPB Environment and Education Centre, Rainham Marshes
 The Guardian, 13 November – "A Walk On The Wild Side" RSPB Environment and Education Centre, Rainham Marshes
 Building Design, November – "One for the birds" RSPB Environment and Education Centre, Rainham Marshes
 FX Magazine, November – "Getting better" Kaleidoscope, Children and Young People's Centre, Lewisham
 Architecture Today, November – "Spectacular Vernacular" Trinity Events Centre, Suffolk Showground
 Architects' Journal Specification, September – Trinity Events Centre, Suffolk Showground
 The Guardian, 15 June – "Not strictly for birds" RSPB Environment and Education Centre, Rainham Marshes
 School Building, April/May – Kingfisher House, Enfield College, London

2005 

 Architecture Today, September – "Bending the Rules" Wood Lane Pavilion, Latymer Upper School, London
 Grand Designs, August – The Grand Guide: The New Barns "Pastures New" Salthouse, Norfolk
 Building Magazine, May – "Help the non-aged" Kaleidoscope, Children and Young People's Centre, Lewisham
 Building Design, 25 February – "Modern Classic for Meeting of Minds" Centre for Classical and Byzantine Studies, Oxford University
 Sports Facilities, Loft Publications, Barcelona – Featuring: Wood Lane Pavilion, Latymer Upper School, London

2004 

 Architecture Today, September – "School of Thought" New Library, Luckley-Oakfield School
 The Guardian, 30 August – "Strictly for the birds" RSPB Environment and Education Centre, Rainham Marshes
 Architects' Journal, 18 March – "An Englishman's Home" English Heritage East of England's Headquarters, Cambridge
 The Phaidon Atlas of Contemporary World Architecture, Phaidon Press London – Featuring: West Ham Station The Magic of Tents, Loft Publications, Barcelona. Featuring: Burghley Yard

2003 

 Blueprint, December – "Beauty and the Birds" RSPB Environment and Education Centre, Rainham Marshes
 Architecture Today, November – "Birds of a feather" RSPB Environment and Education Centre, Rainham Marshes
 RIBA Journal, November – "NHS responds to treatment" Kaleidoscope, Children and Young People's Centre, Lewisham
 Architecture in Britain, Kenneth Powell Merrell Publishers Ltd London. Featuring: The National Centre for Early Music
 RIBA Sector Reviews, RIBA – Creating Excellent Buildings – A Guide for Clients, CABE London. Featuring: Sutton Hoo
 Architecture and Building, The Architect's Publishing Partnership Limited – Featuring: De Montfort University
 A Guide to London Contemporary Architecture – Architectural Press Allinson & Thornton

2002 

 Building Design, March – "National Treasure" Sutton Hoo Visitors Centre, Suffolk
 Architecture Today, February – "Learning with Louvres" Polhill Information Centre, De Montfort University, Bedford
 RIBA Journal, February – "Teen Dream" Click, Youth Technology Centre, London
 Europe: The Contemporary Architecture Guide – Toto Shuppan Publishing, Tokyo
 The Architecture of London – Jones & Woodward, Weidenfeld Nicolson Illustrated

2000 

 Building Design, 24 November – "Prints of Darkness" Ashmolean Museum, Oxford
 Casabella, May – "West Ham" Jublilee Line Extension, West Ham
 Building Design, 24 March – "Work of High Praise" National Centre for Early Music, St Margarets Church, York
 RIBA Journal, March – "Theatre Studies" Latymer Upper School and Theatre, Hammersmith, London

1999 

 Architects' Journal, 27 May – "Clifftop Hideway" Gateway to the White Cliffs, Dover

1998 

 Architecture Today, October – "Building Stable Condition" Burghley Yard, London
 Building Design, 4 September – Burghley Yard, London
 The Times, 7 August – "White Cliff visitors get a greener view" Gateway to the White Cliffs, Dover
 581 Architects in the World – Toto Shuppan Publishing, Tokyo
 Oxford, An Architectural Guide – Tyack, Oxford Press

1997 

 Architects' Journal, September – "Abbey Anniversary" St Augustine's Abbey Museum, Canterbury

1995 

 Architects' Journal, 26 October – "A sensitive container for Music" Jacqueline du Pre Music Building, Oxford
 Architects' Journal, 24 August – "Variations on an Arts and Crafts Theme" Lucy Cavendish College, Cambridge

1994 

 Architects' Journal, December – "Re-Interpretation of Tradition" Fitzwilliam College, Cambridge
 The Independent, 5 October – "Designing a past for the future" Gateway to the White Cliffs, Dover
 Building Design, 30 September – Gateway to the White Cliffs, Dover
 Building Magazine, June – King Alfred School, London

1993 

 RIBA Journal, July – "School of Thought" King Alfred School, London

1992 

 Building Design, October – "Jubilee Line" Jubilee line extension, West Ham
 Hauser, February – "Tradition and Modern in Harmony" Laurier Rd, London
 New British Architecture – Jonathan Glancy
 Architects London Houses – Newton
 Library Builders – Academy Edition
 Building Sights – Academy Edition

1990 

 Architecture Today, July – "Lessons in logic" Sir George Monoux College

1989 

 Architects' Journal, May – "On the Heritage Trail" Clovelly Visitors Centre, Devon

1988 

 Building Design, 18 November – "Class Structures" Clovelly Visitors Centre, Devon / Jacqueline du Pre Music Building
 Building Design, 28 October – "Music Memorial" Jacqueline du Pre Music Building, Oxford
 Architects' Journal, 27 January – "Housing Traditions" Laurier Rd, London

1987 

 Architects' Journal, 8 April – Clovelly Visitors Centre

1985 

 12 June – "A rare books case" Newnham College, Cambridge

References

External links

Architecture firms based in London